Bory may refer to:


Places
 Bory (Žďár nad Sázavou District), a municipality in the Czech Republic
 Bory, a part of Plzeň in the Czech Republic, and a prison situated there 
 Bory, Levice District, a municipality and village in Slovakia

People
 Alphonse Bory (1838–1891), Swiss politician and President of the Swiss Council of States
 David Bory (born 1976), French retired rugby union player
 Jean-Louis Bory (1919–1979), French writer, journalist and film critic
 Jean-Marc Bory (1934–2001), Swiss actor
 Jenő Bory (1879–1959), Hungarian architect and sculptor
 Bory de Bori és Borfői, a Hungarian noble family
 "Bory", a nickname of P. G. T. Beauregard (1818–1893), Confederate general during the American Civil War

Other uses
 Bory, author abbreviation of Jean Baptiste Bory de Saint-Vincent (1778–1846), French naturalist
 French frigate Commandant Bory, a French frigate launched in 1958

See also
 Bori (disambiguation)
 Borie (disambiguation)